What Max Said is a 1978 Spanish film directed by Emilio Martínez Lázaro. It tells the story of a man who feels disconnected from people around him. It was entered into the 28th Berlin International Film Festival where it won the Golden Bear.

Cast
 Héctor Alterio
 Maria De la Riva - Jacoba
 Myriam De Maeztu
 Ignacio Fernández de Castro
 Gracia Querejeta
 Raúl Sender
 Cecilia Viuarrean

References

External links 
 

1978 films
1970s Spanish-language films
1978 drama films
Films directed by Emilio Martínez Lázaro
Golden Bear winners
Spanish drama films
1970s Spanish films